John D. Payne (May 15, 1933 – May 18, 2019) was an American collegiate and professional football coach. He served as head coach for the Saskatchewan Roughriders (1973–1976), Hamilton Tiger-Cats (1978–1980) and Ottawa Rough Riders (1996) of the Canadian Football League (CFL), compiling a career record of 62–63–3. Payne also was the head football coach at Abilene Christian University from 1985 to 1990, posting a mark of 26–34–2.

Coaching career
After serving as an assistant with Central High School and BYU, Payne moved to the Canadian Football League in 1968. He served as an assistant with the Edmonton Eskimos, Winnipeg Blue Bombers and Saskatchewan Roughriders before becoming the Roughriders head coach in 1973. In his four season as head coach, Payne had a 40–23–1 record and led Saskatchewan to the 1976 Grey Cup.

Payne left the Roughriders in 1977 and joined Tommy Hudspeth's coaching staff with the Detroit Lions. The entire staff was fired on January 9, 1978. He returned to the CFL, replacing Tom Dimitroff as head coach of the Hamilton Tiger-Cats five games into the 1978 season. He had some success with Hamilton, compiling an 18–24–1 record over three seasons and leading the team to the 1980 Grey Cup. After the Tiger-Cats trouncing at the hands of the Edmonton Eskimo dynasty 48–10 in the Grey Cup game, owner Harold Ballard indicated that he preferred recently fired Arizona State football coach Frank Kush over Payne, which led to his resignation.

After leaving the Hamilton TigerCats, Payne went to Texas Christian University, where he coached as the offensive line coach under head coach F.A. Dry from 1981-1983.   He then moved to Chicago to coach with the USFL team, the Chicago Blitz under George Allen.  Payne moved to Arizona when the Blitz franchise was moved and became the Arizona Wranglers.  
In 1985, Payne became head coach at Abilene Christian University located in Abilene, Texas. He was the Wildcats head coach for six seasons  and had a coaching record of 26–34–2.

Payne returned to the CFL in 1993 as the offensive line coach for the Sacramento Gold Miners. In 1995, Norton Herrick, an Orlando, Florida real estate developer, announced plans to move the CFL's Las Vegas Posse to Jackson, Mississippi. Payne was to be the club's head coach, however plans fell through and the relocation did not take place; the team instead folded. In 1996, Payne, then an assistant with the Ottawa Rough Riders, was promoted to head coach. He coached the team to a 3–11 record; the team finished the year 3–15. The Rough Riders ceased operations after the season and Payne became the final coach in the 120-year history of the team.

On November 18, 1997, the New York CityHawks of the Arena Football League named Payne offensive coordinator.

Head coaching record

College

CFL

References

1933 births
2019 deaths
American football centers
American football offensive guards
BC Lions coaches
BYU Cougars football coaches
Detroit Lions coaches
Edmonton Elks coaches
Frankfurt Galaxy coaches
Hamilton Tiger-Cats coaches
High school football coaches in Oklahoma
London Monarchs coaches
Oklahoma State Cowboys football players
Ottawa Rough Riders coaches
Saskatchewan Roughriders coaches
Toronto Phantoms coaches
TCU Horned Frogs football coaches
Toronto Argonauts coaches
Winnipeg Blue Bombers coaches
People from Wewoka, Oklahoma
Coaches of American football from Oklahoma
Players of American football from Oklahoma